Dan Kotter is an American paralympic archer. He participated at the 1964 Summer Paralympics.

Biography 
Kotter was the son of Glenn Kotter. He graduated at a high school in 1960, in which Kotter attended at the University of Illinois. He served as a team manager at the Mount Vernon Senior High School. Kotter lived in Mount Vernon, Indiana during the Paralympic Games, being 21 years old. He also contracted polio, when Kotter was at least one year old. He participated at the 1964 Summer Paralympics, with participating in the archery competition at the Paralympic Games. Kotter  was awarded the gold medal in the Columbia round open event. He scored 586 points. Kotter also participated in the Columbia round team open event along with archers, Bob Hawkes and George Pasipanki, being awarded the gold medal. His team scored 1706 points.

References

External links 
Paralympic Games profile

Living people
Place of birth missing (living people)
Year of birth missing (living people)
People with polio
American male archers
Archers at the 1964 Summer Paralympics
Medalists at the 1964 Summer Paralympics
Paralympic medalists in archery
Paralympic archers of the United States
Paralympic gold medalists for the United States
University of Illinois Urbana-Champaign alumni
20th-century American people